Kamari or Kamri may refer to:
 Kamari, Hamadan
 Kamari, Lorestan